Norwood is a ghost town in north Franklin County, Kansas, United States.

History
The town was named after Henry Ward Beecher's novel Norwood: or, Village Life in New England. A post office was established at Norwood in 1868 which closed and reopened a few times until it closed permanently in 1914.

Today, the city is considered a ghost town, serving only as a stop on the recreational Midland Railway. The town now consists of one house, one train depot, and public restroom facilities.

References

Further reading

External links
 Franklin County maps: Current, Historic, KDOT

Unincorporated communities in Franklin County, Kansas
Unincorporated communities in Kansas
Ghost towns in Kansas